Bir Radha Sherpa is an Indian dancer, who is renowned for winning- Dance Plus (season 3) and Dance Champions.

Early life 
Bir was born on 15 August 1999, in Silchar, Assam. Born in a poor family, Bir always showed a passion for dancing as a child, and performed in many live events in his areas prior to contesting in any notable competition.

Career

Dance Plus 
Bir auditioned for Dance Plus (season 3) and was selected into Team Punit- headed by Punit Pathak. He dominated the entire season to enter the final, and eventually went on to win it successfully. This was also the first win for a dancer in Team Punit.

Dance Champions 
Bir was chosen to represent Dance Plus in Dance Champions, that featured champion dancers who won or were runners-up in different shows. Entering as a favorite, Bir went on the win the competition in the final.

Dance India Dance Li'l Masters 
Mentor for one of team in season 4. Tamman Gamnu from Bir ke Baahubali was the second runner-up of that season.

Notes 

Living people
1999 births
Indian male dancers
21st-century Indian dancers
People from Silchar